Maline Creek is a stream in St. Louis County in the U.S. state of Missouri. It is a tributary of the Mississippi River

A variant name was "Moline Creek". The creek most likely has the name of the local Moline family.

See also
List of rivers of Missouri

References

Geography of St. Louis
Rivers of St. Louis County, Missouri
Rivers of Missouri